Ronald George Polk (born January 12, 1944) is an American professional coach in NCAA Division I college baseball. He was a long-time head baseball coach at Mississippi State and is considered to be the "Father of Southeastern Conference Baseball."  Polk compiled one of the most successful winning records, as a coach, in both MSU and Southeastern Conference history. In 31 seasons as an SEC coach he compiled a 1218-638-2 record. His career record stands at 1373-702-2.  He currently ranks 9th on the all-time wins list nationally for 10+ year Division I coaches. His teams won five SEC championships and five SEC tournament championships. His teams participated in the NCAA tournament twenty-three times, and reached the College World Series eight times.

There were 185 players who played under him as a Head Coach, who signed professional baseball contracts, and 23 of these players played in the major leagues. He coached 35 All-Americans and 76 All-Southeastern Conference players. During his tenure at Mississippi State, Polk had eight players drafted in the first round of the professional baseball draft. He is one of only three coaches in college baseball history to coach at three different schools that have played in the College World Series in Omaha, Nebraska. Georgia Southern University – 1973; Mississippi State University – 1979, 1981, 1985, 1990, 1997, 2007; University of Georgia – 2001. He coached teams that played in Omaha over a period of five decades (nine appearances) including as an assistant coach at the University of Arizona in 1966.

Polk is a member of the following Six Halls of Fame; Georgia Southern University Hall of fame (1990). American Baseball Coaches Association Hall of Fame (1995). State of Mississippi Athletic Hall of Fame (1998). Mississippi State University Athletic Hall of Fame (1998). National College Baseball Hall of Fame (2009). Phoenix, Arizona High School District Hall of Fame (2017). He is a Former President of the American Baseball Coaches Association (1985). Winner of the Lefty Gomez Award which is the highest award given by the American Baseball Coaches Association (1988). Received the highest award given out by the state of Mississippi Athletic Hall of Fame- The "Rube" Award (2017). Mississippi State University named the baseball stadium The Polk-Dement Stadium (1997). Coach Polk has also completed seven tours on the U.S.A. National baseball team coaching staff serving as the head coach two times and as an assistant five times. He has coached in the Olympic Games two times once Seoul, South Korea in 1988 when the team won the gold medal and the other in Atlanta, Georgia in 1996 when the team won the Bronze medal. Polk authored The Baseball Playbook, the leading textbook for baseball in college, and coauthored The Baseball-Softball Playbook with Donna Lopiano.

From 1972 to 1975, he served as the head coach at Georgia Southern. From 2000 to 2001, he coached at Georgia. He has also served as an assistant coach at Arizona, and New Mexico.

In July 2008, Polk was announced as a volunteer assistant coach for the University of Alabama at Birmingham Blazers baseball squad.  The Blazers are coached by Polk's former MSU assistant Brian Shoop.

Polk in 2009 and his former Mississippi State players, Rafael Palmeiro in 2009 and Will Clark in 2006, were inducted into the College Baseball Hall of Fame.  In 2018 he was named as a Legend in the Southeastern Conference.

In 2016 Coach Polk coached in the Cape Cod Baseball League as an assistant coach with the Hyannis Harbor Hawks baseball team.

In May 2020, Mississippi State University announced that Ron Polk would be returning to the university as the Special Assistant to the Athletic Director.

Head coaching record

See also

List of college baseball coaches with 1,100 wins

References

1944 births
Living people
Sportspeople from Boston
Arizona Wildcats baseball coaches
Cape Cod Baseball League coaches
National College Baseball Hall of Fame inductees
Georgia Bulldogs baseball coaches
Georgia Southern Eagles baseball coaches
Miami Dade Sharks baseball coaches
Mississippi State Bulldogs baseball coaches
New Mexico Lobos baseball coaches
UAB Blazers baseball coaches